Auloceromyia is a genus of flies in the family Stratiomyidae.

Species
Auloceromyia pachypoda Fachin, 2015
Auloceromyia pedunculata Pimentel & Pujol-Luz, 2000
Auloceromyia vespiformis Lindner, 1969

References

Stratiomyidae
Brachycera genera
Taxa named by Erwin Lindner
Diptera of South America